Hon.Alice Muthoni Wahome (born April 28, 1959) is a Kenyan politician and current Cabinet Secretary for Water, Sanitation and Irrigation. Wahome was the elected as Member of Parliament for the Kandara Constituency in the March 2013 general elections and successfully defended her seat in 2017 and 2022 prior to resigning her seat to join cabinet. Wahome is a member of UDA.

Education and Career 
Wahome attended Karumu primary school and Siakago high school for her secondary studies. In 1980 to 1984 she attended the University of Nairobi, where she earned a bachelor's degree in law. She then earned a post-graduate diploma in law from Kenya School of Law in 1985. She is a lawyer by profession.

In 1988 she worked at the attorney general's chambers as a state counsel, and in 1989 she worked as a legal practitioner at A. M. Wahome and Company Advocates.
Alice Muthoni is married to Dr Wahome and they have four children.

Political career 
In the  2013 Kenyan General elections, Wahome was elected to represent the Kandara Constituency in parliament under a Jubilee party ticket. In the 2017 Kenyan general elections she reclaimed her seat under the ruling party and won a third term in the 2022 August elections on a UDA ticket.

She actively promoted affirmative action from 1999 to 2001 while serving as vice-chairperson of the Fida council.

She also served a two-year term on the council of the Law Society of Kenya.

After retaining her seat in the 2022 elections she resigned her seat after being nominated to cabinet as Cabinet Secretary for Water and Sanitation by President William Ruto.

After retaining her seat in the 2022 elections she resigned her seat after being nominated to cabinet as Cabinet Secretary for Water, Sanitation and Irrigation by President William Ruto.

References 

Kenyan women in politics
Living people
Members of the 11th Parliament of Kenya
University of Nairobi alumni
21st-century Kenyan women politicians
1959 births